Roland Baar (12 April 1965 – 23 June 2018) was a German rower who competed for his nation at several Olympic Games. After retiring from the sport in 1996, he received the Thomas Keller Medal in 1998. He served on the Athletes' Commission of the International Olympic Committee between 1999 and 2004.

Baar was killed in a car crash in June 2018.

References

External links 
 
 
 

1965 births
2018 deaths
People from Osterholz
Olympic rowers of West Germany
Olympic rowers of Germany
Rowers at the 1988 Summer Olympics
Rowers at the 1992 Summer Olympics
Rowers at the 1996 Summer Olympics
Olympic silver medalists for Germany
Olympic bronze medalists for Germany
Olympic medalists in rowing
German male rowers
Medalists at the 1996 Summer Olympics
Medalists at the 1992 Summer Olympics
International Olympic Committee members
World Rowing Championships medalists for West Germany
World Rowing Championships medalists for Germany
West German male rowers
Thomas Keller Medal recipients
Road incident deaths in Germany
Sportspeople from Lower Saxony
Academic staff of the Technical University of Berlin